Member of the German Parliament is the official name given to a deputy in the German Bundestag.

Member of Parliament refers to the elected members of the federal Bundestag Parliament at the Reichstag building in Berlin. In German a member is called  (Member of the Federal Diet) or officially  (Member of the German Federal Diet), abbreviated MdB and attached. Unofficially the term Abgeordneter (literally: "delegate", i.e. of a certain electorate) is also common (abbreviated Abg., never follows the name but precedes it). 

From 1871 to 1918, legislators were known as Member of the Reichstag and sat in the Reichstag of the German Empire.

In accordance with article 38 of the Basic Law for the Federal Republic of Germany, which is the German constitution, "[m]embers of the German Bundestag shall be elected in general, direct, free, equal, and secret elections. They shall be representatives of the whole people, not bound by orders or instructions, and responsible only to their conscience." An important though not constitutionally required feature of German parliamentarianism is a slightly modified proportional representation.

The 16 federal States of Germany (Länder) are represented by the Bundesrat at the former Prussian House of Lords, whose members are representatives of the respective Länders’ governments and not directly elected by the people.

The 2021 German federal election resulted in the most MPs elected in history, 736.

See also 

 Lists of Bundestag Members
 Category:Lists of Members of the Bundestag

References 

Bundestag
Parliamentary titles
Members of Parliament